The 2008 United States House of Representatives elections in Arkansas were held on November 4, 2008 to determine who will represent the state of Arkansas in the United States House of Representatives. Arkansas has four seats in the House, apportioned according to the 2000 United States Census. Representatives are elected for two-year terms; those elected will serve in the 111th Congress from January 4, 2009 until January 3, 2011.  The election coincides with the 2008 presidential election.

No incumbent was opposed by a candidate from the other major party. The Green Party of Arkansas is the only opponent to the incumbent in most districts. This is the largest number of congressional candidates fielded by an Arkansas party other than the Democratic or Republican parties since the People's Party in 1894. All incumbents were reelected.

Overview 

Note that results from Arkansas's 1st congressional district, where only one Democratic ran, were not reported.

District 1 

 
This district covers the northeast part of the state. CQ Politics forecasted the race as 'Safe Democrat'.
Marion Berry (D) - Incumbent
Race ranking and details from CQ Politics
Campaign contributions from OpenSecrets

Marion Berry won unopposed. The Secretary of State of Arkansas did not report vote totals for the election.

District 2 

 
This district covers central Arkansas. CQ Politics forecasted the race as 'Safe Democrat'.
Vic Snyder (D) - Incumbent
Deb McFarland (Green)
Danial Suits (Write-in)
Race ranking and details from CQ Politics
Campaign contributions from OpenSecrets

District 3 

 
This district covers the northwest corner of the state. CQ Politics forecasted the race as 'Safe Republican'.
John Boozman (R) - Incumbent
Abel Noah Tomlinson (Green)
Race ranking and details from CQ Politics
Campaign contributions from OpenSecrets

District 4 

 
This district is roughly the southwest half of the state. CQ Politics forecasted the race as 'Safe Democrat'.
Mike Ross (D) - Incumbent
Joshua Drake (Green)
Race ranking and details from CQ Politics
Campaign contributions from OpenSecrets

References

External links 
U.S. Congress candidates for Arkansas at Project Vote Smart
Arkansas U.S. House Races from 2008 Race Tracker
Campaign contributions for Arkansas congressional races from OpenSecrets

2008
Arkansas
United States House of Representatives